Randonautica (a portmanteau of "random" + "nautica") is an app launched on February 22, 2020 founded by Auburn Salcedo and Joshua Lengfelder. It randomly generates coordinates that enable the user to explore their local area and report on their findings. According to its creators, the app is "an attractor of strange things," letting one choose specific coordinates based on a certain theme. It has gained controversy after several reports on the app generating coordinates, seemingly coincidentally, where disturbing things were present.

Overview 
The app, which creators claim to be inspired by chaos theory and Guy Debord's Theory of the Derive, offers its users three types of coordinates to choose from: an attractor, a void, or an anomaly. The app has a cult following on YouTube and TikTok and there is a subreddit made by the creators for users of the app.

History 
29-year-old circus performer Joshua Lengfelder discovered a bot called Fatum Project in a fringe science chat group on Telegram in January 2019. According to The New York Times, "He absorbed the project’s theories about how random exploration could break people out of their predetermined realities, and how people could influence random outcomes with their minds." Lengfelder then created a Telegram bot using Fatum Project's code, generating coordinates. He then created the subreddit r/randonauts in March. In October, developer Simon Nishi McCorkindale made the bot's webpage.

With the help of Auburn Salcedo, chief executive of a TV agency, both created Randonauts LLC. Salcedo became the chief operating officer while Lengfelder is the CEO. The app, called Randonautica, was launched on February 22, 2020.

Reception 
The app has as many as 10.8 million users as of July 2020, gaining popularity amid the COVID-19 pandemic in the United States as restrictions have been lightened. Emma Chamberlain made a YouTube video about the app that helped increase its following. i-D reported that the hashtag #randonautica has gained 176.5 million views on TikTok, although it has not marketed itself yet.

Controversy 

With the app's popularity users started reporting coincidences which many find unsettling. The majority of reports were from TikTok and Reddit, as well as Telegram. 

The most trending controversy involves a group of people heading to a beach in Duwamish Head, Puget Sound, West Seattle per the app, where they found a bag with two dead bodies, 27 and 36, male and female, as reported by the Seattle Police homicide detectives. In August 2020 police arrested and charged their landlord, Michael Lee Dudley, in connection to the murder. In March 2021 Dudley was denied bail and other people are under suspicion of aiding Dudley in the dismemberment and disposal of the bodies, but no one else has been charged. This has caused speculation that the app has an intended, puzzle-like theme, however Lengfelder stated that it is "a shocking coincidence." Salcedo called the videos fake, and that "It’s so hard to manage, because people are really taking creative liberties after seeing how much traction the app is getting in that fear factor."

In their questions page, Randonautica's creators have said that if the app generates coordinates inside a private property, it is a violation of their terms and conditions to trespass. In addition, Randonautica has also received allegations that the app is used for human trafficking, which its creators have denied, saying that data collected by the app are anonymous. It also ensured that the app is not designed to violate religious customs, saying that "the app is simply a tool. Just as a knife can be used either to prepare dinner or to cut somebody."

See also 

 Geocaching
 Geohashing, another game of visiting random coordinates
 Pokémon Go, an app with similar controversies
 Ingress (video game), as above

References

External links 

 Randonautica official website
 r/randonauts, a subreddit for Randonauts
 The relevant randomness rig at Australian National University

Mobile applications
Geographic data and information
Controversies
Orienteering